Suriclone (Suril) is a sedative and anxiolytic drug in the cyclopyrrolone family of drugs. Other cyclopyrrolone drugs include zopiclone and pagoclone.

Suriclone has a very similar pharmacological profile to the benzodiazepine family of drugs including sedative and anxiolytic properties but with less amnestic effects, and its chemical structure is quite different from that of the benzodiazepine drugs.

The mechanism of action by which suriclone produces its sedative and anxiolytic effects is by modulating GABAA receptors, although suriclone is more subtype-selective than most benzodiazepines.

References 

Carbamates
Chloroarenes
Cyclopyrrolones
GABAA receptor positive allosteric modulators
Naphthyridines
Piperazines
Sedatives
Dithianes
Nitrogen heterocycles
Sulfur heterocycles
Heterocyclic compounds with 2 rings